The 2015–16 Triobet Baltic Basketball League was the 12th season of the Baltic Basketball League and the first under the title sponsorship of Triobet.

Overview
This season’s competition included 6 teams from Estonia, 5 teams from Latvia and Lithuania and one team from Kazakhstan, which played all its games away. For the regular season the teams were divided into two groups of seven teams and competed in a round-robin competition system, with team facing each of their opponents twice. The teams qualified for the eighth-finals based on their ranking after the regular season. Out of the five teams who participated in FIBA Europe Cup competition – Ventspils, Juventus, Šiauliai, TÜ/Rock and Pieno žvaigždės – the latter three didn't qualify for the FIBA Europe Cup playoffs and thus begin their journey at the start of the BBL play-offs, seeded respectively first, second and third based on last season’s results. All play-off games were played in home-and-away series.

Tartu Ülikool/Rock became the first Estonian team to reach the Baltic League finals. In the Finals they lost with an aggregate score of 157–176 to Lithuanian team Šiauliai who won their third title in a row. Third place belonged to Lithuanian side Lietkabelis who beat Latvian team Valmiera/ORDO with aggregate score of 160–154.

Teams

Team information

Regular season

The Regular season ran from October 13, 2015 to January 27, 2016.

Group A
{| class="wikitable" style="text-align: center;"
! width=20|  !! width=210|Team !! width=30| !! width=30| !! width=30|  !! width=30|!! width=30|!!width=35|!! width=30| !! width=120| Qualification
|- bgcolor=#CCFFCC
|1.||align="left"| Lietkabelis || 12 || 10 || 2 || 1026 || 888 || +138 || 22
| rowspan=7 align="center"|Playoffs
|- bgcolor=#CCFFCC
|2.||align="left"| Valmiera/ORDO || 12 || 9 || 3 || 941 || 865 || +76 || 21
|- bgcolor=#CCFFCC
|3.||align="left"| AVIS Rapla|| 12 || 7 || 5 || 838 || 897 || –59 || 19
|- bgcolor=#CCFFCC
|4.||align="left"| TLÜ/Kalev || 12 || 6 || 6 || 895 || 916 || –21 || 18
|- bgcolor=#CCFFCC
|5.||align="left"| Nevėžis || 12 || 4 || 8 || 889 || 909 || –20 || 16
|- bgcolor=#CCFFCC
|6.||align="left"| Barons/LDz || 12 || 4 || 8 || 910 || 941 || –31 || 16
|- bgcolor=#CCFFCC
|7.||align="left"| Pärnu Sadam || 12 || 2 || 10 || 899 || 982 || –83 || 14

Group B
{| class="wikitable" style="text-align: center;"
! width=20|  !! width=210|Team !! width=30| !! width=30| !! width=30|  !! width=30|!! width=30|!!width=35|!! width=30| !! width=120| Qualification
|- bgcolor=#CCFFCC
|1.||align="left"| Vytautas || 12 || 11 || 1 || 1005 || 894 || +111 || 23
| rowspan=6 align="center"|Playoffs
|- bgcolor=#CCFFCC
|2.||align="left"| Liepāja/Triobet || 12 || 8 || 4 || 939 || 909 || +30 || 20
|- bgcolor=#CCFFCC
|3.||align="left"| Jēkabpils || 12 || 7 || 5 || 921 || 914 || +7 || 19
|- bgcolor=#CCFFCC
|4.||align="left"| Rakvere Tarvas || 12 || 6 || 6 || 914 || 891 || +23 || 18
|- bgcolor=#CCFFCC
|5.||align="left"| Jūrmala/Fēnikss || 12 || 5 || 7 || 884 || 870 || +14 || 17
|- bgcolor=#CCFFCC
|6.||align="left"| Barsy Atyrau || 12 || 3 || 9 || 900 || 970 || –70 || 15
|- bgcolor=#FFCCCC
|7.||align="left"| TTÜ || 12 || 2 || 10 || 845 || 960 || –115 || 14 || align"center"|Eliminated

Playoffs

Bracket

Player statistics
Players qualify to this category by having at least 50% games played.

Points

Assists

Rebounds

Efficiency

Awards

MVP of the Month
{| class="wikitable" style="text-align: center;"
! align="center"|Month
! align="center" width=200|Player
! align="center" width=200|Team
! align="center" width=|Ref.
|-
|October 2015||align="left"| Andrew Warren ||align="left"| Pärnu Sadam || 
|-
|November 2015||align="left"| Paulius Petrilevicius ||align="left"| Pärnu Sadam || 
|-
|December 2015||align="left"| Laimonas Kisielius ||align="left"| Vytautas ||  
|-
|January 2016||align="left"| Ronaldas Rutkauskas ||align="left"| Jēkabpils ||

References

External links
 

Baltic Basketball League seasons
2015–16 in European basketball leagues
2015–16 in Lithuanian basketball
2015–16 in Estonian basketball
2015–16 in Latvian basketball
2015–16 in Kazakhstani basketball